Chibusa Dam is a gravity dam located in Tokyo prefecture in Japan. The dam is used for water supply. The catchment area of the dam is  km2. The dam impounds about 1  ha of land when full and can store 35 thousand cubic meters of water. The construction of the dam was started on 1971 and completed in 1973.

References

Dams in Tokyo Prefecture
1973 establishments in Japan